The 2018–19 CEV Challenge Cup was the 39th edition of the CEV Challenge Cup tournament, the former CEV Cup. 42 teams were participating from 28 countries.

Participating teams

Format 
Qualification Phase (Knock-out with Home and Away Matches):
1st Round (if needed) → 2nd Round

Main Phase (Knock-out with Home and Away Matches):
1/16 Finals → 1/8 Finals→1/4 Finals

Final Phase (Knock-out with Home and Away Matches):
Semi-Finals → Final

Aggregate score is counted as follows: 3 points for 3–0 or 3–1 wins, 2 points for 3–2 win, 1 point for 2–3 loss. In case the teams are tied after two legs, a Golden Set is played immediately at the completion of the second leg.

Qualification phase

2nd round

|}
1 Tricolorul LMV Ploiești withdrew and Levski Sofia advanced automatically.

First leg

|}

Second leg

|}

Main phase

16th finals

|}

First leg

|}

Second leg

|}

8th finals

|}

First leg

|}

Second leg

|}

4th finals

|}

First leg

|}

Second leg

|}

Final phase

Semifinals

|}

First leg

|}

Second leg

|}

Finals

|}

First leg

|}

Second leg

|}

References

External links
 Official site

CEV Challenge Cup
CEV Challenge Cup
CEV Challenge Cup